Breyer Animal Creations (commonly referred to as simply Breyer) is primarily a manufacturer of model horses. Founded in 1950, the company, now a division of Reeves International, Inc, specializes in model horses made from cellulose acetate, a form of plastic, and produces other animal models from the same material as well. Less well known are its porcelain horse figures, which are aimed at the adult collector market. The company also produces model tack accessories and horse-related structures, such as stables, barns, and grooming implements in scale to its model horses.

History
Breyer Animal Creations was founded in 1950 in Chicago, Illinois, as Breyer Molding Company. It gained recognition when commissioned by F.W. Woolworth to create a horse statue (now known as the # 57 Western Horse) to adorn a mantel clock. It was approximately 1:9 scale and the model was retained as payment for molding the parts. Orders began to roll in for the horse only and the Breyer Animal Creations company was founded. Since then, Breyer has become a leader in producing model horses.

In 1984, Reeves International acquired Breyer Animal Creations and spent the next 20 years completing its transformation from toy distribution to manufacturing. Model horses are sold through independent distributors and the Breyer website.

While Breyer products were originally manufactured in the United States, production now takes place in China.

Production processes
Each horse is cast in a two to three piece mold. Both halves are then put together and the seams are sanded and polished. Markings and color patterns are usually obtained by using a stencil known as a mask, although most older models were airbrushed by hand, with markings such as undefined socks or a bald face merely left unpainted. Most detailing, such as eye-whites (common on 1950s and 1960s models and is now enjoying a resurgence in modern models), brands, or other individual markings are painstakingly hand-painted. Sometimes, a variation in the paint job occurs. A variation is a difference, usually in the paint job, of one or a minority of a model as they came from the factory. The reason for variations is rarely known. For example, there is a common mold typically called the Proud Arabian Stallion (abbreviated PAS by collectors). For many years it was produced by Breyer with a dappled gray coat and a gray mane, tail and hooves. However, for some unknown reason a few of these models came from the factory with black manes, tails, and hooves, and black socks or stockings. These special, rare models are considered variations of the Dapple Grey PAS model and are very valuable compared to the regular model, which is quite common. They were later determined to be their own unique colorway, and not a variation.

Collector value of products
The rarity of the model is a method of judging collectibility and value. A model can be defined as rare if it was released for a short time period a long while back, so there are not many left in circulation, or if it was released in very limited numbers. The most extreme cases of this are the very few Breyer releases that are one-of-a-kind (OOAK), which are always given out as prizes or sold off at auction for charity at the yearly Breyerfest gatherings. These horses are by far the most coveted and highly valued model horses.

BreyerFest
BreyerFest was first held in 1989 and since then has been held annually in July at the Kentucky Horse Park in Lexington, Kentucky. This popular event is a three-day festival for model horse collectors of all ages. During this event, attendees can purchase special run Breyer models sold only at Breyerfest, purchase RR (Regular Run) and retired models from Breyer and dealers in attendance, and participate in large model horse shows. In addition, there are classes on how to paint, customize, and repair models as well as lectures on collecting and judging them. Special guests of honor, usually renowned trainers and famous horses, are also present and perform for the attendees. Typically, the equine guest of honor has been previously represented by a Breyer model horse. A live auction is held each year featuring one-of-a-kind model horses created by Breyer and sold to the highest bidder, often for thousands of dollars. A silent auction for rare or customized models and model horse related accessories is also held. Included in the purchase price of a 3-day ticket is a Traditional-scale "Celebration" model, and 1-day ticket holders receive a Stablemate-scale model. Each BreyerFest has a unique theme, upon which many or all of the special-run models are designed.

See also
 List of fictional horses

References

External links
Breyer Horses Official Homepage

Model horses
Model manufacturers of the United States
Manufacturing companies based in Chicago
Design companies established in 1950
1950 establishments in Illinois
Manufacturing companies established in 1950
American companies established in 1950